Hugh and I Spy was a black-and-white British sitcom that was transmitted in 1968. It was the sequel of the long-running Hugh and I. Hugh and I Spy was written by John Chapman and produced by David Croft.

Cast
Terry Scott – Himself
Hugh Lloyd – Himself

Outline
The sixth and final series of Hugh and I showed Terry and Hugh on a cruise, Hugh having won £5,000 on the Premium Bonds. In Hugh and I Spy, they have returned but they get unwillingly involved in espionage and double-dealing. Each episode ended in a cliffhanger.

All the episodes were thought to be lost until 2013 when the sixth episode was recovered. (See Wiping).

Hugh and I Spy Episode 6 – "Tea or Coffin" – came from the Patrick Duffy collection. This was sold through the medium of eBay to the highest bidder in March 2013.

Episodes

References

External links 
 
 Mark Lewisohn, Radio Times Guide to TV Comedy, BBC Worldwide Ltd, 2003
British Sitcom Guide for Hugh and I Spy

1968 British television series debuts
1968 British television series endings
1960s British sitcoms
BBC television sitcoms
David Croft sitcoms
Lost television shows